("special treatment") is any sort of preferential treatment. However, the word Sonderbehandlung was used as a euphemism for mass murder by Nazi functionaries and the SS, who commonly used the abbreviation S.B. in documentation. It first came to prominence during Action T4, where SS doctors killed mentally ill and disabled patients between 1939 and 1941, and was one of a number of nonspecific words the Nazis used to document mass murder and genocide.

Berel Lang states that disguised language was used "...not only in communications issued to the Jewish public when the intention of those issuing the communications was to deceive the Jews in order to minimize the likelihood of resistance, but also in addresses to the outside world and, perhaps more significantly, in internal communications as well, among officials who unquestionably knew (who were themselves sometimes responsible for) the linguistic substitutions stipulated by the language rules."

Background 

By the summer of 1941, Action T4 became widespread public knowledge in Germany (and also in neutral countries and to Germany's enemies), and on August 24, 1941, Hitler ordered the joint chief of the operation Dr. Karl Brandt to halt it due to public protest; however, the operation continued, not only out of the public eye, but also in greater intensity. Hitler did not want to run the risk of an order publicly embarrassing him again and, as a result, the explicit order to carry out the Holocaust was given by him orally. Even if there had been any written instances of this order, they would have almost certainly been destroyed by the Nazis when they realised their defeat was inevitable.

Where the Nazis had to document murder,  was one of a number of euphemisms used. The Action T4 doctors used  ("disinfected") to document the gassing of mentally ill and handicapped individuals. The actual plan to exterminate the Jews of Europe was called  ("Final Solution to the Jewish Question"). Other words to describe extermination operations included:

 ("evacuation")
 ("expulsion")
 ("resettlement")
 ("thinning out" – as in the removal of inhabitants from a ghetto)
 ("pacification")
 ("having-been-migrated")
 ("cleansing")
 ("directed" or worked through in a manner in accordance with the )

The Posen speeches made by Heinrich Himmler in October 1943 are the first known documents in which a high-ranking member of the Nazi government spoke explicitly about the perpetration of the Holocaust during the war. At one point in the speech, Himmler says: "elimination of the Jews, extermination, we're doing it", briefly pausing in the middle of "elimination" before going on to say "extermination". His hesitation in the middle of saying "elimination" can be considered as a quick mental check to see whether or not it would have been acceptable to use such words in front of his given audience; however, as the speech was given to the seniority of the SS in private, such language would have been acceptable to use. This has been compared to another incident of self-verification in the opposite way, where Josef Goebbels, in his Total War speech on February 18, 1943, begins to say  ('extermination of Jewry') but switches to saying , bearing in mind that he is speaking very publicly.

Usage 

The term first appeared on September 20, 1939 in a decree by the Gestapo and  chief SS- Reinhard Heydrich to all state police departments:

However, the usage is directed against Germans rather than Jews (it relates to "the principles of internal state security in the war"). Nevertheless, the law allowed for the killing of any person the regime wished. A memo dated six days later from a meeting at the  defines  with "execution" following it in brackets.

A report from the Eastern Front dated October 25, 1941, reads that "due to the grave danger of epidemic, the complete liquidation of Jews from the ghetto in Vitebsk was begun on October 8, 1941. The number of Jews to whom special treatment is to be applied is around 3,000." An excerpt of a decree dated February 20, 1942, from the RSHA and written by Himmler regarding the treatment of "foreign civilian workers" advises that in particularly difficult cases, application should be made to the RSHA for special treatment, adding that "special treatment takes place by hanging." In a letter to the RSHA,  Heinz Trühe requests additional gas vans for "...a transport of Jews, which has to be treated in a special way..." The gas vans were vehicles containing an airtight compartment in which the victims were locked and the exhaust gas was pumped into, killing the victims with the combined effects of carbon monoxide poisoning and suffocation.

Equipment 

In German, meaning "special", can be used to form compound nouns. As well as in reference to actions, the Nazis used euphemisms to refer to the actual equipment used to carry out killing.

Several instances of this unspecific language in reference to equipment can be found in documents concerning Auschwitz concentration camp. In the letter, this is given in quotes, further suggesting the euphemistic nature of what is meant. A document dated August 26, 1942 granted the camp authorities to send a truck "... to Dessau to pick up material for special treatment..." - Dessau was one of two places where Zyklon B was manufactured. Standard usage of the term for killing at Auschwitz applied. A letter dated October 13, 1942, signed by Bischoff, states that construction of new crematoria facilities "... was necessary to start immediately in July 1942 because of the situation caused by the special actions." On September 8, 1943, 5,006 Jews were transferred from Theresienstadt to Auschwitz under the designation "SB six months." Six months later on March 9, 1944, those still alive were gassed.
In his diary,  and doctor Johann Kremer describes seeing a mass gassing for the first time:

Three days later, Kremer described the mass gassing of emaciated prisoners, nicknamed :

In the letter, the word is underlined, and at the top of the document is written:  There was a very clear policy in the architecture office that words such as "gas chamber" should not be used; Second Lieutenant Kirschnek should be informed of this slip. Citing this unique letter, Robert Jan van Pelt states that in using "special action" or "special treatment" in place of extermination and killing, the first Holocaust deniers were the Nazis themselves, in that they attempted to deny to themselves what they were doing.

Sensitivity 
Heinrich Himmler became increasingly concerned about the security of documenting the destruction of the Jews. On April 9, 1943, he wrote a secret letter to Heydrich's successor as chief of the Gestapo and SD,  Ernst Kaltenbrunner, concerning the Korherr Report. Himmler considered the report "well executed for purposes of camouflage and potentially useful for later times." The next day,  Rudolf Brandt passed a message to the author of the report, Richard Korherr, stating:

Himmler was so sure that almost everyone knew what "special treatment" meant, and ordered for it to be replaced with the even more vague  ("guided through"), even though the document in question was top secret. The camps in question in the General Government were Treblinka, Sobibor and Belzec extermination camps, and Majdanek concentration camp. The only camp in the Warthegau was Chełmno extermination camp.

Nazi perspectives 
In the course of investigations and criminal proceedings for Nazi war crimes, it was shown that among those involved, there was no doubt what was meant by this term. At his trial,  Adolf Eichmann stated that "everybody knew" special treatment meant killing.

Later he expanded his explanation to point out that "special treatment" also included auxiliary measures besides killing:

See also 
 LTI – Lingua Tertii Imperii

References

Bibliography 
Friedlander, Henry (1997). The Origins of Nazi Genocide: From Euthanasia to the Final Solution. University of North Carolina Press. 
Gutman, Yisrael; Berenbaum, Michael (editors). (1994) Anatomy of the Auschwitz Death Camp. Indiana University Press. 
Kogon, Eugen; Langbein, Hermann. (1994) Nazi mass murder. Yale University Press 
Lang, Berel (2003). Act and idea in the Nazi genocide. Syracuse University Press. 
Langbein, Hermann (2004). People in Auschwitz. University of North Carolina Press. 
Pressac, Jean-Claude (1989). Auschwitz: Technique and operation of the gas chambers. New York: Beate Klarsfeld Foundation
Shermer, Michael; Grobman, Alex (2009). Denying history: who says the Holocaust never happened and why do they say it? University of California Press 
Zimmerman, John C. (2000). Holocaust denial: demographics, testimonies, and ideologies. University Press of America. 

Nazi terminology
Euphemisms
German words and phrases